Torbenella orbis is a species of squat lobsters in the family Munididae.

References

Squat lobsters
Crustaceans described in 2005